XXX is the thirteenth studio album (also including live material) by the American rock band ZZ Top, released in September 1999. The album's title commemorates the band's 30th anniversary.

Reception

Allmusic only gave the album one and a half stars, and in its review by Stephen Thomas Erlewine, he states: "After all, countless blues-based musicians, from Lightnin' Hopkins and Muddy Waters to B.B. King and The Rolling Stones, have aged gracefully, albeit in varying degrees. So why does ZZ Top sound so stiff and useless on XXX, a record celebrating their 30th anniversary? Part of that could be that the songwriting is decidedly weak, but a band as seasoned as ZZ Top should be able to make third-rate material at least listenable."

A more positive review was posted by RoughEdge.com, whose reviewer R. Scott Bolton gave it three out of four guitars and stated that the album "represents the best of both worlds of ZZ Top [...] [t]he bluesy sounds that highlight their early years [and] the special effects and tricks that made their later recordings so popular".

The album peaked at number 100 on the Billboard 200.

Track listing

Additional studio track on the Japanese edition

Personnel

ZZ Top
Billy Gibbons – guitar, vocals
Dusty Hill – bass, keyboards, backing vocals, lead vocal on "(Let Me Be) Your Teddy Bear"
Frank Beard – drums, percussion

Additional personnel
Jeff Beck – guitar on "Hey Mr. Millionaire"

Production
Producer: Billy Gibbons
Engineer: Joe Hardy
Assistant engineer: Gary Moon
Mixing: Joe Hardy
Mastering: Bob Ludwig
Digital editing: Brad Blackwood
Recording: Joe Hardy
Art direction: Bill Narum

Charts
Album – Billboard

Singles – Billboard

References

ZZ Top albums
1999 albums
Albums produced by Billy Gibbons
RCA Records albums